Rebecca & Fiona is a Swedish DJ duo from Stockholm. The duo was founded by Rebecca Scheja and Fiona FitzPatrick in 2007, when they met at a party and started to work and make music together as DJs. In 2010 they released their debut single "Luminary Ones" and during 2010-2011 they were support act for Robyn, other notable performances during those years were also at the Polar Music Prize and the Swedish music festival Way Out West.

Since their breakthrough, Rebecca & Fiona have released two Grammis winning albums and toured most parts of the globe together - both as headlines and with leading artists like Robyn, Avicii, Tiësto, Kaskade and Axwell. Following their success in the US, they have also had a residency in Las Vegas and played at major festivals such as Beyond Wonderland Tomorrowland and Electric Daisy Carnival. Musically they have collaborated with a wide range of producers and writers including Little Jinder, Dolores Haze, Adrian Lux, Kaskade, Duvchi, Kurt Uenala, The Loops of Fury, Panda Da Panda, Tommie Sunshine and Spank Rock.

Musical career

Background 

Stockholm born Rebecca Scheja and Fiona FitzPatrick, daughters of musicians Staffan Scheja and Greg Fitzpatrick respectively, met at a friend's house party and started to make music together in 2007. After a couple of years touring around Sweden as DJs, they made their public breakthrough in 2010 with the release of their first single "Luminary Ones". In the same year, the Swedish Public Service (SVT) presented the docu-drama Rebecca & Fiona. The awarded show was the network's first to be produced exclusively for the web and proved to be a massive hit.

In 2011 their debut album I Love You, Man! was released, followed by the single "Bullets" and their second album Beauty Is Pain in 2014. Both albums won a Grammis for "Best Electro/Dance Albums".

Contemporary career 
In the past few years, Rebecca & Fiona have pursued more of a pop sound with singles like "Holler, Sayonara" and "Shotgun". After breaking free from a major record company, spring 2018 marks the release of their third album Art of Being a Girl.

"We're really aware of what we do. It’s important for women and young people. We stand up for what we think and believe, and we want to inspire people to do cool stuff and to not let anything hold them back. Look into yourself and discover what you want to do. That’s the way we live and make our music."

They released their first independent single, "Need You" in April 2018, followed by single "Fool's Gold" on May 18, 2018.

They performed with a T-shirt with the communist symbol hammer and sickle at Stockholm Pride 2018.

Discography

Studio albums

Extended plays

Singles 
Charting

Others
2010: "Luminary Ones"
2011: "If She Was Away / Hard"
2011: "Jane Doe"
2011: "Turn It Down" (with Kaskade)
2012: "Dance"
2012: "Giliap"
2013: "Union"
2013: "Hot Shots"
2014: "Candy Love"
2014: "Holler"
2016: "Drugstore Lovin'"
2016: "Shotgun"
2016: "Cold As X-mas"
2017: "Pop Bitches"
2017: "Pay Me Money"
2018: "Need You"
2018: "Fool's Gold"
2018: "Different" (featuring Marcy Chin)
2018: "Stupid"
2019: "One More Night"
2019: "Down For It" (with Moti)
2019: "Can't Erase" (with Nause)
2020: "Heart Skips a Beat"
2020: "Fet House Mode"
2020: "I Need Love" (with Kleerup)
2020: "People Getting Mad"
2020: “Sad Boy, Happy Girl / Lyfe Lyne" (with Moguai)
2020: “Champagne Promises” (with ANIMAL)
2020: "Another World"
2021: “Bad Trip” (with LVNDSCAPE feat. ØZMA)
2021: “Rivers”
2021: “Replay” (with John Dahlbäck)
2021: “Real Love”
2021: “Sing It Back”
2021: “Sweetest Delight”
2021: “All the Things She Said” (cover of the 2002 international debut single by Russian pop-duo t.A.T.u.)

Featured singles
2010: "Låna Pengar" (Basutbudet featuring Rebecca & Fiona)
2011: "Boy" (Adrian Lux featuring Rebecca & Fiona)
2011: "Turn It Down" (Kaskade featuring Rebecca & Fiona)
2019: "Apollo" (Wayfloe featuring Rebecca & Fiona)

References

External links 

Interview, N by Norwegian

All-female bands
Electronic music duos
English-language singers from Sweden
Feminist musicians
Living people
Musical groups established in 2010
Musical groups from Stockholm
Swedish dance music groups
Swedish DJs
DJs from Stockholm
Swedish electronic music groups
Swedish expatriates in the United States
Swedish feminists
Swedish house music groups
Swedish musical duos
Swedish pop music groups
Swedish women in electronic music
Year of birth missing (living people)
Electronic dance music DJs
Female musical duos
2010 establishments in Sweden